Ivaylo Petkov (born 24 March 1976 in Dolni Dabnik, Pleven Province) is a former Bulgarian footballer, who played mainly as a left back and centre-back. He has won three A PFG titles, one Süper Lig title, a Bulgarian Cup and Bulgarian Supercup at Club Level, playing for 6 different teams throughout his career.

Career
Petkov start to play football in Spartak Pleven. In 1995, he made his debut for the first team. He started to make his name in season 1997–98 when played for the present team Litex Lovech. After that he played for İstanbulspor, Fenerbahçe SK and Ankaragücü football clubs in Turkey and Kuban Krasnodar in Russia.

In January 2009, Petkov returned to Bulgaria and signed with Litex Lovech. He has won two A PFG titles, a Bulgarian Cup and a Bulgarian Supercup. At the end of 2010–11 season, Petkov announced his retirement from professional football.

Career statistics
(Correct )

International career
Petkov made his first appearance for Bulgaria in 1996 when he was picked by Hristo Bonev for the friendly against Saudi Arabia on 6 November. He scored his first international goal on 18 August 1999, with a 32-yard shot in a 1–1 friendly draw against Ukraine. For Bulgaria, Petkov was capped 63 times, scoring 3 goals.

He was part of the 1998 FIFA World Cup and the Euro 2004 squads, playing the first two matches in both competitions.

International goals
Scores and goals list Bulgaria's goal tally first.

Honours
 Litex Lovech
 Bulgarian League (3): 1997–98, 2009–10, 2010–11
 Bulgarian Cup (1): 2008–09
 Bulgarian Supercup (1): 2010

 Fenerbahçe
 Süper Lig (1): 2003–04

Notes

External links
 
 
 
 

1976 births
Living people
Bulgarian footballers
Bulgaria international footballers
People from Dolni Dabnik
PFC Spartak Pleven players
PFC Litex Lovech players
İstanbulspor footballers
MKE Ankaragücü footballers
Fenerbahçe S.K. footballers
FC Kuban Krasnodar players
Russian Premier League players
1998 FIFA World Cup players
UEFA Euro 2004 players
First Professional Football League (Bulgaria) players
Süper Lig players
Bulgarian expatriate footballers
Expatriate footballers in Turkey
Bulgarian expatriate sportspeople in Turkey
Expatriate footballers in Russia
Association football defenders